The Sennkogel is a mountain in the Schnalskamm group of the Ötztal Alps. 

Originally bearing the name 3rd Kreuzköpfe, the first ascendant, E.J. Häberlin from Frankfurt am Main suggested to rename it after Franz Senn, who had made many first ascents in the Ötztal Alps in the 1860s, including the neighboring Fineilspitze and Kreuzspitze, and the Fluchtkogel, Mutmalspitze, Firmisanschneide, Spiegelkogel, and Weißseespitze. The nomenclature was accepted by Heinrich Heß in his chapter on the Ötztal Alps in Die Erschliessung der Ostalpen, Volume 2.

Mountains of Tyrol (state)
Mountains of the Alps
Alpine three-thousanders
Ötztal Alps